Better Living Through Criticism is a book by A. O. Scott on the societal role of criticism.

References

External links

Criticism
Penguin Press books
2016 non-fiction books